The Elements is the eighth  studio album by American recording artist TobyMac released on October 12, 2018, on ForeFront Records. It is his fifth album to top the Billboard Christian Albums chart. The album's lead single, "I Just Need U.", peaked at No. 1 on the Hot Christian Songs chart.

Critical reception

Chris Major of The Christian Beat gave the album a 4.8 out of 5, claiming the album is "TobyMac at his best". Jesus Freak Hideout's Christopher Smith praised TobyMac's ability make his musical influences his own, and called the album a "no-filler" and "more mature" album. Marcos Papadatos from Digital Journal called it TobyMac's "most compelling studio album to date". CCM Magazines Natalie Gillespie praised TobyMac's ability to "blend" many musical styles into the album.

Commercial performance
The album debuted No. 18 on the Billboard 200 and No. 1 on the Christian Albums chart, selling 22,000 units in its debut week.

Track listing

History 
The Elements is tobyMac's first album since Welcome to Diverse City, in 2004, not to crack the top 10 on the Billboard 200, and his shortest by duration, at a mere 40 minutes and 42 seconds.

Personnel

 Toby McKeehan – lead vocals and background vocals
 Bryan Fowler – background vocals, electric guitars, bass guitar, guitars, keyboards, piano, drums, and programming
 Sean Cook – bass, keyboards, and programming
 Cory Wong – guitars
 David Garcia – keyboards, guitars, programming, and background vocals
 Tim Rosenau – guitars
 Michael "DJ Maj" Allen – DJ cuts
 Tommee Profitt – keyboards and programming
 Cole Walowac – programming, additional drum programming
 Todde "Toddefunk" Lawton – bass
 Micah Kuiper – guitar, bass, programming, and background vocals
 Jon Reddick – upright piano
 Josiah Kreidler – guitars
 Dave Lubben – keyboards, programming and background vocals
 NOMAD – guitars
 Keith Everette Smith – trumpet, horns
 Steve Patrick – trumpet
 Tyler Summers – tenor sax
 Barry Green – trombone
 Terrian – background vocals
 Aaron Cole – vocals on "Starts with Me"
 Ryan Stevenson – background vocals
 Blake NeeSmith – background vocals
 Hollyn – background vocals
 Jackson Nance – background vocals
 Gabe Patillo – background vocals
 Jason Eskridge – background vocals

Accolades

Charts

Weekly charts

Year-end charts

References

2018 albums
TobyMac albums
ForeFront Records albums